Marion Gay Wofford ( Dickinsheets, July 9, 1922 – October 30, 2013) was an American politician in the state of South Dakota. She was a member of the South Dakota House of Representatives from 1979 to 1988. She was a businesswoman. Wofford received her education at the University of Minnesota, University of South Dakota, University of Utah, Western Reserve University and Columbia Presbyterian Medical Center. She lived in Sioux Falls, South Dakota. She died in Sioux Falls, South Dakota on October 30, 2013, at the age of 91.

References

1922 births
2013 deaths
Case Western Reserve University alumni
South Dakota Republicans
University of Minnesota alumni
University of South Dakota alumni
University of Utah alumni